The chairperson, also chairman, chairwoman or chair, is the presiding officer of an organized group such as a board, committee, or deliberative assembly. The person holding the office, who is typically elected or appointed by members of the group, presides over meetings of the group, and conducts the group's business in an orderly fashion.

In some organizations, the chairperson is also known as president (or other title). In others, where a board appoints a president (or other title), the two terms are used for distinct positions. Also, the chairman term may be used in a neutral manner not directly implying the gender of the holder.

Terminology 

Terms for the office and its holder include chair, chairperson, chairman, chairwoman, convenor, facilitator, moderator, president, and presiding officer. The chairperson of a parliamentary chamber is often called the speaker. Chair has been used to refer to a seat or office of authority since the middle of the 17th century; its earliest citation in the Oxford English Dictionary dates to 1658–1659, four years after the first citation for chairman. Chairman has been criticized as sexist.

In World Schools Style debating, as of 2009, chair or chairperson refers to the person who controls the debate; it recommends using Madame Chair or Mr. Chairman to address the chair. The FranklinCovey Style Guide for Business and Technical Communication and the American Psychological Association style guide advocate using chair or chairperson. The Oxford Dictionary of American Usage and Style (2000) suggested that the gender-neutral forms were gaining ground; it advocated chair for both men and women. The Telegraph style guide bans the use of chair and chairperson; the newspaper's position, as of 2018, is that "chairman is correct English". The National Association of Parliamentarians adopted a resolution in 1975 discouraging the use of chairperson and rescinded it in 2017.

Usage 

The word chair can refer to the place from which the holder of the office presides, whether on a chair, at a lectern, or elsewhere. During meetings, the person presiding is said to be "in the chair" and is also referred to as "the chair". Parliamentary procedure requires that members address the "chair" as "Mr. (or Madam) Chairman (or Chair or Chairperson)" rather than using a name – one of many customs intended to maintain the presiding officer's impartiality and to ensure an objective and impersonal approach.

In the British music hall tradition, the chairman was the master of ceremonies who announced the performances and was responsible for controlling any rowdy elements in the audience. The role was popularised on British TV in the 1960s and 1970s by Leonard Sachs, the chairman on the variety show The Good Old Days.

"Chairman" as a quasi-title gained particular resonance when socialist states from 1917 onward shunned more traditional leadership labels and stressed the collective control of Soviets (councils or committees) by beginning to refer to executive figureheads as "Chairman of the X Committee". Vladimir Lenin, for example, officially functioned as the head of Soviet Russian government not as prime minister or as president but as "Chairman of the Council of People's Commissars of the Russian SFSR". At the same time, the "Chairman of the All-Russian Central Executive Committee" was the head of the state, an office held by Kalinin between 1919 and 1938, when it was replaced by the "Chairman of the Presidium of the Supreme Soviet of the Russian SFSR".
Later, Mao Zedong was commonly called "Chairman Mao", as he was officially Chairman of the Chinese Communist Party and Chairman of the Central Military Commission.

Roles and responsibilities

Duties at meetings 

In addition to the administrative or executive duties in organizations, the chairperson presides over meetings. Such duties at meetings include:

 Calling the meeting to order
 Determining if a quorum is present
 Announcing the items on the order of business or agenda as they come up
Recognition of members to have the floor
 Enforcing the rules of the group
 Putting questions (motions) to a vote, which is the usual way of resolving disagreements following discussion of the issues 
 Adjourning the meeting

While presiding, the chairperson should remain impartial and not interrupt a speaker if the speaker has the floor and is following the rules of the group. In committees or small boards, the chairperson votes along with the other members; in assemblies or larger boards, the chairperson should vote only when it can affect the result. At a meeting, the chairperson only has one vote (i.e. the chairperson cannot vote twice and cannot override the decision of the group unless the organization has specifically given the chairperson such authority).

Powers and authority 
The powers of the chairperson vary widely across organizations. In some organizations they have the authority to hire staff and make financial decisions. In others they only make recommendations to a board of directors, and or may have no executive powers, in which case they are mainly a spokesperson for the organization. The power given depends upon the type of organization, its structure, and the rules it has created for itself.

Disciplinary procedures 
If the chairperson exceeds their authority, engages in misconduct, or fails to perform their duties, they may face disciplinary procedures. Such procedures may include censure, suspension, or removal from office. The rules of the organization would provide details on who can perform these disciplinary procedures. Usually, whoever appointed or elected the chairperson has the power to discipline them.

Public corporations 
There are three common types of chairperson in public corporations.

Chairperson and CEO
The chief executive officer (CEO) may also hold the title of chairperson, in which case the board frequently names an independent member of the board as a lead director. This position is equivalent to the position of président-directeur général in France.

Executive chairperson 
Executive chairperson is an office separate from that of CEO, where the titleholder wields influence over company operations, such as Larry Ellison of Oracle, Douglas Flint of HSBC and Steve Case of AOL Time Warner. In particular, the group chair of HSBC is considered the top position of that institution, outranking the chief executive, and is responsible for leading the board and representing the company in meetings with government figures. Before the creation of the group management board in 2006, HSBC's chair essentially held the duties of a chief executive at an equivalent institution, while HSBC's chief executive served as the deputy. After the 2006 reorganization, the management cadre ran the business, while the chairperson oversaw the controls of the business through compliance and audit and the direction of the business.

Non-executive chairperson 
Non-executive chairperson is also a separate post from the CEO; unlike an executive chairperson, a non-executive chair does not interfere in day-to-day company matters. Across the world, many companies have separated the roles of chairperson and CEO, saying that this move improves corporate governance. The non-executive chairperson's duties are typically limited to matters directly related to the board, such as:

Chairing the meetings of the board.
Organizing and coordinating the board's activities, such as by setting its annual agenda.
Reviewing and evaluating the performance of the CEO and the other board members.

Examples 

Many US companies have an executive chairperson; this method of organization is sometimes called the American model. Having a non-executive chairperson is common in the UK and Canada, and is sometimes called the British model. Expert opinion is rather evenly divided over which is the preferable model. There is a growing push by public market investors for companies with an executive chairperson to have a lead independent director to provide some element of an independent perspective.

The role of the chairperson in a private equity-backed board differs from the role in non-profit or publicly listed organizations in several ways, including the pay, role and what makes an effective private-equity chairperson. Companies with both an executive chairperson and a CEO include Ford, HSBC, Alphabet Inc., HP, and Apple.

Vice-chairperson and deputy chairperson 
A vice- or deputy chairperson, subordinate to the chairperson, is sometimes chosen to assist and to serve as chairperson in the latter's absence, or when a motion involving the chairperson is being discussed. In the absence of the chairperson and vice-chairperson, groups sometimes elect a chairperson pro tempore to fill the role for a single meeting. In some organizations that have both titles, deputy chairperson ranks higher than vice-chairperson, as there are often multiple vice-chairpersons but only a single deputy chairperson. This type of deputy chairperson title on its own usually has only an advisory role and not an operational one (such as Ted Turner at Time Warner).

An unrelated definition of vice- and deputy chairpersons describes an executive who is higher ranking or has more seniority than an executive vice-president (EVP). Sometimes, EVPs report to a vice-chairperson, who in turn reports directly to the chief executive officer (CEO) (so vice-chairpersons in effect constitute an additional layer of management), while other vice-chairpersons have more responsibilities but are otherwise on an equal tier with EVPs. Executives with the title vice-chairperson and deputy chairperson are usually not members of the board of directors.

See also 
Executive director
Non-executive director
Parliamentary procedure in the corporate world
President (corporate title)

References

Further reading 

 
Management occupations
Parliamentary procedure
Political neologisms
Positions of authority